Adouakouakro is a village in Ivory Coast. It is in the sub-prefecture of Assahara, M'Batto Department, Moronou Region, Lacs District.

Adouakouakro was a commune until March 2012, when it became one of 1126 communes nationwide that were abolished.

Notes

Former communes of Ivory Coast
Populated places in Lacs District
Populated places in Moronou Region